Adeshina Abayomi Lawal (born 17 October 1984) is a Nigerian professional footballer who plays as a centre forward for AB Argir.

Career
Brought in from the Nigerian FC Ebedei Football Academy to Denmark at a young age, Lawal joined FC Midtjylland's youth academy. In March 2006 he renewed his contract with Vejle Boldklub until 1 July 2010. Lawal played 2009 Vejle Boldklub of the Danish Superliga, but he was on loan to Lyngby Boldklub. After the end of the season 2010 joined to Swedish club Kristianstads FF. In December 2012 he made contract with B36 Tórshavn in the Faroe Islands. In 2015, he signed for ÍF Fuglafjørður

He joined Víkingur Gøta in 2017, and scored the winning goal in their 2–1 2017–18 Champions League home triumph over KF Trepça'89 of Kosovo.

Honours
B36 Tórshavn
 Faroe Islands Premier League Team of the season: 2014

References

External links
 
 
 Fanpage 

Living people
1984 births
Association football forwards
Nigerian footballers
Nigerian expatriate footballers
Yoruba sportspeople
F.C. Ebedei players
FC Midtjylland players
Vejle Boldklub players
Lyngby Boldklub players
Hobro IK players
B36 Tórshavn players
ÍF Fuglafjørður players
Víkingur Gøta players
Argja Bóltfelag players
Danish Superliga players
Danish 1st Division players
Ettan Fotboll players
Faroe Islands Premier League players
Expatriate men's footballers in Denmark
Expatriate footballers in Sweden
Expatriate footballers in the Faroe Islands
Nigerian expatriate sportspeople in Denmark
Nigerian expatriate sportspeople in Sweden
People from Ibadan
Sportspeople from Ibadan